Runaway Papoose is a children's novel by Grace Moon. It is a contemporary story of Native American children from the southwestern United States. Illustrated by the author's husband, Carl Moon, the novel was first published in 1928 and was a Newbery Honor recipient in 1929.

Plot
Nah-tee, a Native American girl about four years old, runs away from her family's day-camp when a visiting stranger frightens her. She meets a Navajo shepherd boy named Moyo, who agrees to help her find her family; after many adventures, they arrive at a large regional powwow where Nah-tee is reunited with her family.

References

External links
The life and work of Carl and Grace Moon

1928 American novels
American children's novels
Newbery Honor-winning works
Southwestern United States in fiction
Fictional Navajo people
1928 children's books